Shoma A. Chatterji is an Indian film scholar, author and freelance journalist. She has been the recipient of a number of awards including the National Film Award for Best Film Critic in 1991 and the National Awards for Best Writing on Cinema for her study of the works of Aparna Sen in the publication, Parama and Other Outsiders: The Cinema of Aparna Sen (2002). Notably, she is the only woman to have won both the national awards. She is the author of several biographies including those on Pramathesh Barua, Ritwik Ghatak and Suchitra Sen.

Between 2005–2006, Chatterji was a research fellow at the National Film Archive of India, following which between 2006–2007, she was a senior research fellow at the PSBT Delhi and then a senior research fellow at the Indian Council of Social Science Research between 2009–2011. Born and educated in Mumbai, Chatterji has two Master's degrees in economics and education and a PhD in Indian cinema history. Following her education, she was a lecturer in economics at a local college until 1991.

Awards 

 National Film Award for Best Film Critic in 1991 for film criticism in the Bengali language.
Bengal Film Journalists Association’s Best Critic Award in 1998.
 National Awards for Best Writing on Cinema in 2003 for a study of the works of Aparna Sen.
 Bharat Nirman Award for "excellence in journalism" in 2004.
 UNFPA–Laadli Media Special Award for "consistent writing on women’s issues" in 2009.
 Kalyan Kumar Mitra Award for "excellence in film scholarship and contribution as a film critic" in 2010.
 Lifetime Achievement SAMMAN by the Rotary Club, Calcutta-Metro City in 2012.

Selected works 

 The Indian Women's Search for an Identity. (1988) Vikas Publishing House. .
 The Indian Woman in Perspective. (1993) Ajanta Publications. .
 Kamini: And Other Stories. (1997) Alka Publications. .
Subject-cinema, Object-woman: A Study of the Portrayal of Women in Indian Cinema. (1998) 
 Baker's Dozen: Short Stories from India. (2001) Rupa & Company. .
 Parama and Other Outsiders: The Cinema of Aparna Sen. (2002) Parumita Publications. .
 Ritwik Ghatak: The Celluloid Rebel. (2004) Rupa & Company. .
 Women in Black, White, and Technicolour. (2004) Rupa & Company. .
 Sinemā śudhu sinemā naẏa (Movies are not just movies, 2004)
 Mrinal Sen: The Survivor. (2005) Rupa & Company. .
 Goddess Kali of Kolkata. (2005) UBS Publishers. .
 Gender and Conflict. (2006) UBS Publishers. .
 P.C Barua. (2008) Wisdom Tree Publishers. .
 Women in Perspective: Essays on Gender Issues. (2010)
 P.C. Barua: Legends of Indian Cinema. (Vasudev, Aruna, ed; 2011) SCB Distributors. .
 100 Years of Jump-cuts and Fade-outs: Tracking Change in Indian Cinema. (2014) Rupa & Company. .
 Filming Reality: The Independent Documentary Movement in India. (2015) SAGE Publications. .
 Suchitra Sen: The Legend and the Enigma. (2015) HarperCollins. .
 Woman at the Window: The Material Universe of Rabindranath Tagore Through the Eyes of Satyajit Ray. (2017) HarperCollins. .
 The Cinema of Bimal Roy: An 'Outsider' Within. (2017) SAGE Publications. .

References

Living people
Indian film critics
20th-century Indian women writers
20th-century Indian writers
21st-century Indian women writers
21st-century Indian writers
1943 births